is a Japanese monthly sports magazine devoted to the sport of table tennis. Although significantly more expensive (720¥ per issue) than other Japanese table tennis magazines like Nittaku News and The Table Tennis Report, the magazine sells 700,000–800,000 copies annually, according to president Noboru Konno (今野昇), making it one of the most popular sports magazines in Japan.

References

Table tennis magazines
Sports magazines published in Japan
Monthly magazines published in Japan
Magazines established in 1997
Magazines published in Tokyo